Chapel Allerton Hospital is located in the area of Chapel Allerton, Leeds, West Yorkshire, England and is operated by the Leeds Teaching Hospitals NHS Trust. The main entrance is on Chapeltown Road, with vehicle exits onto Harehills Lane and Newton Road.

History

The hospital was founded in 1927, to care for injured soldiers from the First World War under the then Ministry of Pensions, replacing a military hospital at Beckett Park.  It was opened on 16 May 1927 by Princess Mary.  She had been welcomed by the Leeds Lord Mayor Hugh Lupton, whose niece, Anne Lupton, had been appointed a MBE in 1920 for her work on the Leeds War Pensions Committee, advising injured soldiers. The hospital was built in the grounds of Gledhow Grove mansion, and the mansion itself was also used. Gledhow Grove had been the  home of both Albert Kitson, Lord Airedale and his  first  cousin -  Frederick James Kitson, Leeds Lord Mayor in 1908 and 1910.  Lord  and Lady Airedale had owned the nearby  Gledhow Hall Estate.
 
In 1953 the hospital was transferred to the Ministry of Health and developed as a general hospital. In 1975 the Newton Green Wing was opened in purpose-built buildings on the opposite, south, side of Harehills Lane. It  was  named  after  the   Newton  Green  Hall estate,  acquired in  1936, upon  which  the  new  hospital  buildings  were built. New accommodation for the whole hospital was added on this site 1992-1994, and opened by the Duchess of Kent. The old hospital buildings were demolished, the Grade II listed mansion has been left derelict with new housing built in the grounds.

Chapel
The chapel is located on the third floor of the north wing.

Broadcasting
The hospital operates a 24/7 radio station, Radio Allerton, which has broadcast to both staff and patients since 1978.

See also
 List of hospitals in England

References

External links
Leeds teaching hospitals NHS Trust: Chapel Allerton Hospital

Hospital buildings completed in 1927
Hospital buildings completed in 1975
Hospitals in Leeds
Grade II listed buildings in West Yorkshire
Listed buildings in Leeds
NHS hospitals in England